William Lloyd George, 3rd Viscount Tenby, JP (born 7 November 1927), is a British peer and former Army officer. Tenby was elected one of the initial ninety hereditary peers to remain in the House of Lords after the passing of the House of Lords Act 1999 until his retirement in 2015.

Biography

Tenby is the son of Gwilym Lloyd George, 1st Viscount Tenby, and Edna Gwenfrom Jones. He was educated at Eastbourne College and St Catharine's College, Cambridge, where he won an exhibition and graduated with a BA degree in 1949. His father was a National Liberal politician who later served as Home Secretary under Winston Churchill and Anthony Eden. The 3rd Viscount Tenby's paternal grandfather was David Lloyd George (later the Earl Lloyd-George of Dwyfor), Liberal Prime Minister (1916–1922), who previously served as Chancellor of the Exchequer 1908–1915; thus he and his heirs are also in remainder to that earldom. His elder brother, Captain David Lloyd George RA, served in the Second World War and succeeded as the Viscount Tenby in 1967; he died unmarried on 4 July 1983, aged 60.

In 1955, the Hon. William Lloyd George, as he was known then, married Ursula Diana Ethel Medlicott, daughter of Lieutenant-Colonel Henry Edward Medlicott DSO. They have two daughters and one son. Lady Tenby died in 2022.

Tenby is a Justice of the Peace for Hampshire. Tenby stood down from the House of Lords on 1 May 2015. Retirement of peers was enabled following the House of Lords Reform Act 2014: Tenby's retirement as a crossbench hereditary peer triggered a by-election, which was won by Jeffrey Evans, 4th Baron Mountevans.

References

External links

 Profile, Cracroft's Peerage. Accessed 10 January 2023.

1927 births
Living people
People educated at Eastbourne College
Alumni of St Catharine's College, Cambridge
Royal Welch Fusiliers officers
Viscounts in the Peerage of the United Kingdom
Younger sons of viscounts
Crossbench hereditary peers
William
Justices of the peace

Hereditary peers elected under the House of Lords Act 1999